Anthony John Stastny (June 3, 1885 – April 17, 1923) was an American composer and founder of one of the largest music publishing firms in North America during the 1920s — A. J. Stasny Music Co.  Sometime after 1910, he modified the original Bohemian spelling of his surname to Stasny.  Stasny had also been the musical director Howard Thurston, magician.

Early career 
Stastny and his publishing company were originally located in Cleveland.  In 1910 he relocated to New York City.  He composed numerous popular songs and piano solo works.

Selected compositions 
 Rose dreams, song, founded on the melody of the famous Rose dreams reverie, poem by J.R. Shannon, music by A.J. Stasny (1916)
 The Cactus and the Rose: a Western Idyl, by A.J. Stastny & M.T. Bohannon, A.J. Stastny Music Co. (1918) 
 Dance Of The Moon Birds, by A. J. Stanstny, A. J. Stastny Music Co., Cleveland (1911) 
 High Stepper March & Two Step, arr. by A. L. Maresh (1907) 
 An Arabian Fantasy (1923)
 Don't Waste Your Tears Over Me, words and music by A.J. Stasny (1923)

Stastny family 
Anthony was the born in Cleveland, Ohio, to Frank Stastny (1857–1913) and Barbara Stastny ( Barbara Aneska Vlk; 1863–1945), both immigrants from Bohemia.  He had a brother, Frank W. Stastny, Jr. (1883–1936), and a sister, Mary M. Stastny (Mrs. Edward Frank Soika) (1882–1967).

His wife — Betty (Bessie) Stasny ( Fisher; died November 19, 1974), — had served as president of the publishing company after his death.  Prior to marrying Anthony, she had been on the stage, playing with Eddy Foy, Al Jolson, and Nora Bayes.

Anthony died in Manhattan, New York, and was buried at Lake View Cemetery, Cleveland.  Betty Stastny was interred at Fairview Cemetery Red Bank, New Jersey.

References

External links 
 

Music publishers (people)
1869 births
1923 deaths
Musicians from Cleveland
American people of Czech descent